Muravyov (from  meaning ant), or Muravyova (feminine form), also transliterated as Muraviev, Muravyev or Murav'ev, is a common Russian last name. It may refer to:

Alexey Muravyov (1900–1941), Soviet army officer
Darya Muravyeva (born 1998), Kazakhstani water polo player 
Dimitry Muravyev (born 1979), Kazakhstani road bicycle racer
Irina Muravyova (born 1949), Soviet actress 
Konstantin Muraviev (1893–1965), Bulgarian politician
Matvey Muravyev (1784–1836), Russian explorer
Mikhail Muravyov (disambiguation) – several people
Nadezhda Muravyeva (born 1980), Russian handball player
Nikita Muravyov (1795–1843), a member of the Decembrist movement
Nikolay Muravyov-Amursky (1809–1881), a Russian statesman and diplomat
Nikolay Muraviev (1850–1908) Russian statesman
Nikolay Muravyov-Karsky (1794–1866), Russian military leader and statesman
Olena Muravyova (1867–1939), Ukrainian opera singer
Vladimir Muravyov (athlete) (born 1959), former Soviet track and field athlete
Vladimir Muravyov (translator) (1939–2001), Russian translator and literary critic
Vyacheslav Muravyev (born 1982), Kazakhstani sprinter

See also
Muraviev Amurski-class cruiser, pair of light cruisers Russian empire ordered in 1912 from a Danzig shipyard, seized in 1914 for the German Kriegsmarine
Muravyov-Apostol (disambiguation), several people
6538 Muraviov, an asteroid

Russian-language surnames